This is a list of railway tunnels in Kerala.

Location 
The state of Kerala is sandwiched between Western Ghats and Laccadive Sea and the state has an undulating topography. The state is served by Thiruvananthapuram railway division, Palakkad railway division and Madurai railway divisions in Southern Railway zone of Indian Railways.

List

See also 

 List of rail tunnels in India by length

References 

Thiruvananthapuram railway division
Palakkad railway division
Madurai railway division
Kerala
Tunnels
Railway tunnels
Indian railway-related lists